Minatitlán International Airport  is an international airport located in Cosoleacaque, Veracruz, Mexico, near Minatitlán. It handles national and international air traffic for the cities of Minatitlán and the south-eastern region of Veracruz state.

General Information
It is one of nine airports in southeast Mexico operated by Aeropuertos del Sureste (ASUR).

In 2020, the airport handled 70,295 passengers, and in 2021 it handled 98,544 passengers. 

The airport has the exclusive VIP lounge, the Caral VIP Lounge.

Airlines and destinations

Destinations map

Statistics

Passengers

See also 

List of the busiest airports in Mexico

References

External links
 Minatitlán Intl. Airport

Airports in Veracruz